The men's Laser class at the 2014 ISAF Sailing World Championships was held in Santander, Spain 12–18 September.

Results

References

Laser
Laser World Championships